Harmatia is an extinct genus of sea snails, marine gastropod mollusks, in the subfamily Muricinae , the murex snails or rock snails.

Etymology 
The taxon was named after István Harmat, Hungarian mine manager, fossil shell collector, friend of the author, Jenő Noszky Sr. (1880–1951), Hungarian geologist, paleontologist.

Description 
Harmatia species are characterized by medium-sized, subfusiform shell, rounded spire whorls, long, narrow, slightly curved siphonal canal without cord spines, penultimate siphonal canal present, narrow primary spiral cords, three spiny varices per whorl, six long spines on the last whorl.

Distribution 
This genus is known in the fossil record from the Middle Eocene – Early Oligocene period. Fossil shells within this genus have been found in Austria and Hungary.

Species 
Species included in the genus:
H. stephani Noszky, 1940. Type species. Early Oligocene, Hungary
H. guembeli guembeli (Dreger, 1892). Early Oligocene, Austria
H. guembeli longispina (Noszky, 1940). Early Oligocene, Hungary
H. tokodensis Kovács & Vicián, 2020. Middle–Late Eocene, Hungary

References 

Merle, D., Garrigues, B. & Pointier, J.-P. (2011). Fossil and Recent Muricidae of the World. Part Muricinae. ConchBooks, 648 pp.
Löffler, S.-B. (1999). Systematische Neubearbeitung und paläoökologische Aspekte der unteroligozänen Molluskenfauna aus den Zementmergeln von Bad Häring (Unterinntal, Tirol). Tübinger Geowissenschaft liche Arbeiten A: Geologie, Paläontologie, Stratigraphie 54: 1–207.

Muricinae
Extinct gastropods
Oligocene gastropods
Eocene gastropods
Paleogene gastropods of Europe